A massif is a type of mountainous geological formation. Massif may also refer to:

Places

Geography
 Massif Central, a highland region of Southern France
 Massif du Nord, a mountain range in Haiti
 Mount Massif, a mountain in Tasmania, Australia

Ski areas
 , a ski resort located in Quebec, Canada
 Massif du Sud, a ski resort located in Quebec, Canada

Other uses
 Iveco Massif, a utility 4x4 vehicle
 Valgrind Massif, a heap profiler tool

See also

 
 
 Mass (disambiguation)
 Massive (disambiguation)
 Mount (disambiguation)
 Mountain (disambiguation)
 Mountain range

Disambiguation pages